Newtown may refer to:

Places

Australia
Newtown, New South Wales
Newtown, Queensland (Ipswich)
Newtown, Queensland (Toowoomba)
Newtown, Victoria, a suburb of Geelong
Newtown, Victoria (Golden Plains Shire), a locality near Ballarat

Canada
 Newtown, Newfoundland and Labrador

India
 New Town, Kolkata

Ireland
 Newtown, Ballymore, a townland in the civil parish of Ballymore, barony of Rathconrath, County Westmeath
 Newtown, Ballymurreen, County Tipperary, a townland in North Tipperary
 Newtown, County Cork, a census town
 Newtown, County Dublin
 Newtown, County Laois
 Newtown, County Leitrim
 Newtown, County Meath, a civil parish of Ireland
 Newtown, County Tipperary, a settlement in the barony of Owney and Arra
 Newtown, County Westmeath, several townlands in County Westmeath
 Newtown, County Westmeath (civil parish), a civil parish in the barony of Moycashel
 Newtown, Delvin, a townland in the civil parish of Delvin, County Westmeath
 Newtown, Ormond Lower County Tipperary, a townland in the barony of Ormond Lower
 Newtown (Guest), County Tipperary, a townland in the barony of Ormond Lower
 Newtown (Hodgins), County Tipperary, a townland in the barony of Ormond Lower
 Newtown, Iffa and Offa East, a townland in County Tipperary
 Newtown, Ikerrin, two townlands in County Tipperary
 Newtown, Kilcumreragh, a townland in Kilcumreragh civil parish, barony of Kilcoursey, County Offaly
 Newtown, Kilnamanagh Lower, a townland in County Tipperary
 Newtown, Kilnamanagh Upper, two townlands in County Tipperary
 Newtown (Kinawley), a townland in Kinawley Civil parish, County Cavan
 Newtown, Ormond Upper, a townland in County Tipperary
 Newtown, Owney and Arra, two townlands in County Tipperary
 Newtown, Templeport, a townland in Templeport civil parish, County Cavan

Isle of Man
 Newtown, Isle of Man

New Zealand
 Newtown, New Zealand, a suburb of Wellington
 Newtown (New Zealand electorate), a former parliamentary electorate, 1902–1908

South Africa
Newtown, Johannesburg

United Kingdom
England
Newtown, Birmingham
Newtown, Chester
Newtown, Cornwall
Newtown, Allerdale, Cumbria
Newtown, Irthington, Cumbria
Newtown, Derbyshire
Newtown, Dorset, a district of Poole
Newtown, Exeter
Newtown, Hampshire
Newtown, Herefordshire, a village near Ivington
Newtown, Isle of Wight
Newtown, Kent, an area of Ashford
Newtown, Pendlebury, Greater Manchester, the location of Bridgewater Mill and Newtown Mill; see List of mills in Salford
Newtown, Reading
Newtown, Shropshire, a village in Shropshire
Newtown, Staffordshire
Newtown, Stockton-on-Tees
Newtown, West Tisbury, Wiltshire
Newtown, Worcestershire, a UK location
Newtown-in-St Martin, Cornwall
Newtown Linford, Leicestershire
Newtown Unthank, Leicestershire

Northern Ireland
Newtown, County Down, a townland in Kilbroney, County Down
Newtown, County Antrim, a townland in Ardclinis
Newtown, County Armagh, a townland in County Armagh
Newtown, County Fermanagh, a townland in County Fermanagh 
Newtown Upper, a townland in Kilbroney, County Down
Scotland
Newtown St Boswells, in the Scottish Borders
Wales
Newtown, Cardiff
Newtown, Powys

United States
Newtown, California
Newtown, El Dorado County, California
Newtown, Mariposa County, California
Newtown, Nevada County, California
Newtown, Shasta County, California, a place in Shasta County, California
Newtown, Connecticut, incorporated Town in Fairfield County
Site of the Sandy Hook Elementary School shooting in 2012, the fourth deadliest mass shooting in American history.
Newtown (borough), Connecticut, incorporated Borough in Fairfield County
Newtown (Palatka), a neighborhood of Palatka, Florida
Newtown (Sarasota, Florida)
Newtown, Illinois
Newtown, Indiana
 Newtowne, an old name for Cambridge, Massachusetts, and its vicinity
 Newtown, an old name for Newton, Massachusetts
Newtown, Missouri
Newtown, New Jersey
 Newtown, an old name for the neighborhood of Elmhurst, Queens, New York
Newtown, Ohio
Newtown, Pennsylvania
Newtown, Bucks County, Pennsylvania
Newtown, Schuylkill County, Pennsylvania
Newtown Township, Bucks County, Pennsylvania
Newtown Township, Delaware County, Pennsylvania
Newtown, South Carolina
Newtown, Virginia
Newtown, Albemarle County, Virginia
Newtown, Greene County, Virginia
Newtown, King and Queen County, Virginia
Newtown, Lancaster County, Virginia
Newtown, Virginia Beach, Virginia, in Princess Anne County, Virginia
Stephens City, Virginia, which was formerly known as Newtown

Sports
 Newtown A.F.C., Wales
 Newtown Jets, a founding team in the New South Wales Rugby League, Australia
 Newtown United FC, Saint Kitts and Nevis

Other uses
 Newtown (EP), a 2014 EP by Japanese band Folks
 Battle of Newtown, American Revolutionary War
 Jack Newtown, a nickname of F1 World Champion Jacques Villeneuve
 Newtown, a fictional town in the show Benjamin The Elephant

See also
 New Town (disambiguation)
 Newton (disambiguation)
 Newtonville (disambiguation)
 Newtown station (disambiguation)
 Novgorod (disambiguation)